Cathy Wurzer is an American journalist and author. She and Eric Eskola are the longtime hosts of Almanac on Twin Cities Public Television. She also hosts the regional portion of Morning Edition on Minnesota Public Radio. In 2008, Wurzer published Tales of the Road: Highway 61, a book about US Highway 61 and Minnesota State Highway 61 in Minnesota.

Biography
Wurzer is a graduate of Minneapolis South High School and the University of Wisconsin-River Falls, where she obtained degrees in broadcast journalism and urban studies.

Before joining Morning Edition and Almanac, Wurzer worked as an anchor and reporter for WCCO-TV, Minneapolis's CBS affiliate. She was also a talk-show host for WCCO-AM radio, a producer for KMSP-TV, and political reporter for KSTP-AM radio.

Wurzer was a trustee for the UW-River Falls Foundation. She is a member and past president of the Society for Professional Journalists Minnesota chapter.

When not working, Wurzer enjoys riding and training horses, fly fishing, and clay sculpting. She is divorced from her Almanac co-host, Eric Eskola.

Honors and awards
Wurzer has won four Emmy Awards while at Almanac.

References
Cathy Wurzer website

Sources
MPR People: Cathy Wurzer
Wurzer, Cathy. Tales of the Road: Highway 61.  Minnesota Historical Society Press, October 2008. 

University of Wisconsin–River Falls alumni
American radio journalists
American television journalists
American women television journalists
American travel writers
American women travel writers
Minnesota Public Radio people
Radio personalities from Minnesota
Writers from Minnesota
Living people
Year of birth missing (living people)
South High School (Minnesota) alumni
21st-century American women